The 2003 Gombe State gubernatorial election occurred in Nigeria on April 19, 2003. The PDP nominee Mohammed Danjuma Goje won the election, defeating Abubakar Habu Hashidu of the ANPP.

Mohammed Danjuma Goje emerged PDP candidate. He picked Lazarus John Yoriyo as his running mate. Abubakar Habu Hashidu was the ANPP candidate with Joshua Lidani as his running mate.

Electoral system
The Governor of Gombe State is elected using the plurality voting system.

Primary election

PDP primary
The PDP primary election was won by Mohammed Danjuma Goje. He picked Lazarus John Yoriyo as his running mate.

ANPP primary
The ANPP primary election was won by Abubakar Habu Hashidu. He picked Joshua Lidani as his running mate.

Results
A total number of 6 candidates registered with the Independent National Electoral Commission to contest in the election.

The total number of registered voters in the state was 1,263,287.

References 

Gombe State gubernatorial elections
Gombe State gubernatorial election
Gombe State gubernatorial election
Gombe State gubernatorial election